Benoît Sauvageau (November 22, 1963 – August 28, 2006) was a Canadian politician, who served as a Bloc Québécois member of the House of Commons of Canada from 1993 until his death in 2006.

Born in Charlemagne, Quebec, he received a Bachelor of Arts degree and was a professor before entering politics. In 1993, he was elected to the House of Commons of Canada for the Quebec riding of Terrebonne. He was subsequently re-elected in the 1997, 2000, and 2004 elections in the redistricted riding of Repentigny. From 2003 to 2004, he was the Deputy Whip of the Bloc Québécois. In the federal election that fell on January 23, 2006, Sauvageau garnered over 62% of the vote in his riding for a landslide victory over the Conservatives and the Liberals, who were still reeling from their political fallout from the sponsorship scandal.

Admired for his warmth and good nature by friend and adversary alike, Sauvageau championed fiscal responsibility on the Public Accounts committee and the language rights of francophones on the Official Languages committee.

Death
Sauvageau died in a car accident in his riding of Repentigny on August 28, 2006, while on the way to a constituency event.

LCN initially reported that just a few minutes before the accident, his wife Jacinthe had called 9-1-1 because Sauvageau had allegedly threatened to commit suicide shortly before leaving their home. However, a coroner's report concluded in August 2007 that Sauvageau did not intentionally crash his vehicle, and confirmed that he was distracted by his cellphone.

Bloc leader Gilles Duceppe described him "as a hard working and determined MP who knew everyone in his riding". Prime Minister Stephen Harper said in a statement that: "Mr. Sauvageau was proud of his francophone roots, and was a dedicated MP who served his constituents well. He was appreciated by his colleagues for his integrity and human values and he will be missed."
Long-time colleague, and then interim Liberal leader, Bill Graham stated that Sauvageau "brought to his job a great dedication and a willingness to work for the common good that made him an admired colleague for all."

Electoral record (partial)

References

External links
 

1963 births
2006 deaths
Bloc Québécois MPs
French Quebecers
Members of the House of Commons of Canada from Quebec
Road incident deaths in Canada
Accidental deaths in Quebec
People from Repentigny, Quebec
People from Charlemagne, Quebec
21st-century Canadian politicians